Hugo Moreno Roa is a Chilean geologist known for his studies of Chilean volcanoes. In 2015 he was awarded the prize Medalla “Juan Brüggen” by Colegio de Geólogos.

References

21st-century Chilean geologists
Chilean volcanologists
Living people
University of Chile alumni
Year of birth missing (living people)